St. Stepanos Church was an Armenian church located on the slope of a hill in the northwestern Verin Get district of Yukhari Aylis village of the Nakhchivan Autonomous Republic of Azerbaijan.

History 
The church was most probably built in the 12th or 13th century and was rebuilt in the 17th century and in 1845.

Architectural characteristics 
The church was built with basalt and reddish-pink colored stones, it was a basilica-style structure with a four-sided dome and a cross-like roof. In the eastern part of the church, on both sides of the main altar, there were quite large and semicircular altars. The church had three entrances, which were located on the southern, western and eastern sides. The domed basilica had three apses facing a main hall, and under the apses were vestries that could be accessed from their bemas. The cupola rested on four cruciform pillars. There were Armenian inscriptions on the southern facade and decorative sculptures around the entrances and windows.

Destruction 
The church was still a standing monument in the 1980s. It has been completely destroyed by February 3, 2000, according to the Caucasus Heritage Watch.

See also 

 St. Kristapor Church (Yukhari Aylis)
 Saint Thomas Monastery of Agulis
 St. Shmavon Church (Yukhari Aylis)
 St. Hakob-Hayrapet Church (Yukhari Aylis)

References 

Armenian churches in Azerbaijan
Ruins in Azerbaijan